Kim Il (born 25 July 1971) is a North Korean freestyle wrestler. He won two Olympic gold medals at the 1992 and 1996 Summer Olympics in the light flyweight (–48 kg) category. He won silver at the 1991 World Championships. In 2006, he was inducted into the Federation Internationale de Luttes Associees Hall of Fame.

References

External links
 

1971 births
Living people
North Korean male sport wrestlers
Olympic wrestlers of North Korea
Wrestlers at the 1992 Summer Olympics
Wrestlers at the 1996 Summer Olympics
Olympic gold medalists for North Korea
Olympic medalists in wrestling
Medalists at the 1992 Summer Olympics
Medalists at the 1996 Summer Olympics
People's Athletes
World Wrestling Championships medalists
Asian Wrestling Championships medalists
20th-century North Korean people